Rawda is a Syrian village located in the Hirbnafsah Subdistrict in Hama District. According to the Syria Central Bureau of Statistics (CBS), Rawda had a population of 479 in the 2004 census.

References 

Populated places in Hama District